The 1952–53 Polska Liga Hokejowa season was the 18th season of the Polska Liga Hokejowa, the top level of ice hockey in Poland. 12 teams participated in the league, and Legia Warszawa won the championship.

First round

Group I

Group II

Group III

Group IV

Final round

External links
 Season on hockeyarchives.info

Polska
Polska Hokej Liga seasons
1952–53 in Polish ice hockey